Ponzi is 2021 Nigerian comedy film based on the victims of the 2016 MMM Ponzi scheme. It was written by Toluwani Obayan, produced by Vincent Okonkwo and directed by Kayode Kasum. It stars Jide Kosoko, Chinyere Wilfred, Timini Egbuson, Tope Tedela, Broda Shaggi and Mr Macaroni. It was released theatrically on 12 March 2021.

Plot 
Abeke the omniscient narrator introduces the residents of a close. Chief Olaoba is a wealthy politician who neglects the needs of the community he represents. He however shows up occasionally to distribute money to his constituents. Bob returns from dispora and goes to the close and gains the trust of the occupants and convinces them to invest in a get-rich-quick scheme named Richvest. This leads to a series of unexpected events.

Cast 
Jide Kosoko as Olaoba, Abeke's father
Chinyere Wilfred as Mrs. Olaoba, Abeke's mother
Mawuli Gavor as Rob, a returnee
Timini Egbuson as Ikenna, a layabout who squats with his elder brother Uchenna.
Mr Macaroni as Uchenna, a lesson teacher
Immaculate Oko-Kasum as Zara, Uchenna's heavily pregnant wife
Tope Tedela as Tafa, Zara's brother, a kebab seller who hopes to make it as a chef
Broda Shaggi as Chudi, a struggling upcoming musician
Amanda Dara as Oluchi
Uzoamaka Aniunoh as Abeke
Zubby Michael as Charles, a neighbourhood hustler and loan shark
Eso Dike as Ikenna 
Caroline Igben as Nike

Production and release 
The movie is based on the experiences of Nigerians during the 2016 MMM online scheme which promised 30% returns on investment. The scheme inadvertently crashed and put subscribers in distress. In an interview, the movie’s producer, said the project is aimed at sensitising Nigerians to avoid get-rich-quick schemes. It was shot in Lagos but set in Ota, Ogun State.

The movie voice technique was employed as Uzo Aniunoh was both an actress and a narrator. This technique has been used in movies like Fight Club and Memento.

Reception 
In a review for Nigerian Entertainment Today, Jerry Chiemeke wrote "The only way for the audience to enjoy this film is to close their eyes to its technical flaws – and they are many. They will probably laugh (a lot), but in the end, a good film transcends giggles, and when it comes down to categorising Nollywood films, this will not be one of the exactly memorable ones." He rated the film a 6/10.

Awards and nominations

References 

Films directed by Kayode Kasum
Nigerian comedy films
English-language Nigerian films
Films about fraud
2020s English-language films